The Eastern Rural Party (Spanish: Partido Ruralista Oriental, PRO) was a small right-wing political party in Bolivia.

The Eastern Rural Party was established in 1978 by a large landowner Víctor Hugones.

In 1978 the Eastern Rural Party allied with the Christian Democratic Party and its candidate René Bernal Escalante.

After the elections on 9 July 1978 the Eastern Rural Party disappeared.

Notes

Defunct political parties in Bolivia
Political parties established in 1978
1978 establishments in Bolivia
Defunct agrarian political parties
Political parties with year of disestablishment missing
Right-wing parties in South America